Amsterdam has a long and eventful history. The origins of the city lie in the 12th century, when fishermen living along the banks of the River Amstel built a bridge across the waterway near the IJ, which at the time was a large saltwater inlet. Wooden locks under the bridge served as a dam protecting the village from the rising IJ waters, which often flooded the early settlement. The mouth of the river Amstel, where the Damrak is now, formed a natural harbor, which became important for trading-exchange from the larger koggeships into the smaller ships that sailed the merchandise deeper into the hinterland.

The oldest document referring to the settlement of "Aemstelredamme" (Amsterdam) 'dam in the river Amstel' comes from a document dated 27 October 1275 CE. Inhabitants of the village were, by this document, exempted from paying a bridge toll in the County of Holland by Count Floris V.

Excavations between 2005 and 2012 found evidence that the origins of Amsterdam are much older than 'only' the twelfth century. During the construction of the Metro "Noord-Zuid lijn" archaeologists discovered, some 30 meters below street level, pole-axes, a stone hammer, and some pottery, all dating from the Neolithic era (New Stone Age).  This would mean Amsterdam, or its predecessor would have seen human habitation since about 2600 BCE.

Medieval feudalism

In 1204, the inhabitants of Kennemer conquered the first aggrem Aemestel, the castle at the Amstel dike, thus resulting in the destruction of the house of Gijsbrecht van Aemstel, who, by name of the Bishop of Utrecht, ruled the area. This event was later used by the Dutch poet Joost van den Vondel to write a historical play, the Gijsbrecht van Aemstel, which since then has been staged every first week of the new year. 
A hundred years later (1304), his descendant, Gijsbrecht van Aemstel VI, tried to claim his alleged rights over the Amsterdam regions, but found himself and his family banished to Flanders.

A more important year in the history of Amsterdam was 1275. While Aemstelland fell under the administrative jurisdiction of the Prince-Bishopric of Utrecht, Count Floris V of the County of Holland -the hindland of Aemstelland, granted traders, sailors and fishermen exemption from tolls. This "Gift Letter" document, dated 27 October 1275, is the oldest recorded usage of the name "Aemstelredamme" - Amsterdam. This meant the inhabitants from the vicinity of Aemstelredamme acquired a right to travel freely through the County of Holland without having to pay tolls at bridges, locks, and dams. This was the very start of the later richness of the young evolving city: by not having to pay tolls, traders could sell merchandise, shipped to Aemstelredamme harbour from everywhere (Scandinavia, Denmark, Germany), at a more competitive price in Amsterdam and the hinterland. After the murder of Count Floris V in 1296, Amstelland again belonged to the Sticht.  By 1327, the name had developed into Aemsterdam.

In 1306, Gwijde van Henegouwen, bishop of Utrecht, gave Amsterdam city rights. After his death (1317), Count Willem III inherited the Aemstelland, whereby Amsterdam fell under the County of Holland.

In 1323, Willem III established a toll on the trade of beer from Hamburg. The contacts laid through the beer trade formed the basis for subsequent trade with cities of the Hanseatic league in the Baltic Sea, from where during the 14th and 15th centuries the Amsterdammers increasingly acquired grain and timber. In 1342, Count Willem IV awarded the city "Groot Privilege", which greatly strengthened the position of the city. During the 15th century, Amsterdam became the granary of the northern low countries and the most important trading city in Holland.

According to legend, on 12 March 1345, the miracle of Amsterdam occurred and Amsterdam became an important pilgrimage town. The town grew considerably thanks to the pilgrims. A Roman Catholic procession (Stille Omgang) occurs every year to celebrate the miracle.

Two great fires swept through the city in 1421 and 1452. After the second, when three quarters of the city were destroyed, Emperor Charles decreed that new houses were to be built from stone. Few wooden buildings remain from this period, a notable example being the Het Houten Huys ("The Wooden House") at the Begijnhof.

Religious strife and revolt
In the first half of the 16th century, with the appearance of Protestant Reform, an important Mennonite (usually called Anabaptist) community formed in Amsterdam. Religious tension grew throughout the Empire until in 1534 the anabaptists of Munster rebelled and emperor Charles V decreed a persecution of all members of this church. In two years, the authorities of Amsterdam executed 71 Mennonites and exiled many others. Executions would continue more sporadically until the 1550s.

The second half of the 16th century brought a rebellion of the Low Countries against the Hapsburg king Philip II of Spain. The uprising was mainly caused by the lack of political power for the local nobility and by the religious conflict between Protestants and Catholics, the latter supported by the Crown. Although Amsterdam began the war on the Crown's side, it changed sides with the Alteratie of 1578 and gave its support to William I of Orange. The rebellion led to the Eighty Years' War and eventually Dutch independence.

One of the results of the uprising was that Amsterdam enjoyed a certain degree of religious tolerance. Officially, only Calvinist worship was permitted, but in practice Catholic "clandestine churches" at private homes were tacitly tolerated, as were Lutheran and Mennonite ones. In the city, a large Roman Catholic minority remained, but the majority of the people belonged to the Calvinist Reformed Church and other Protestant denominations. However, the holding of any public office was restricted to members of the official Reformed Church.

During these years religious wars raged throughout Europe and many people fled to the Dutch Republic and Amsterdam, where they sought refuge. Wealthy Jews from Spain and Portugal, Protestants from Antwerp and the Huguenots from France sought safety in Amsterdam.

The "Golden Age" (1585–1672)

The 17th century was Amsterdam's Golden Age. Ships from the city sailed to North America, Indonesia, Brazil, and Africa and formed the basis of a worldwide trading network. Amsterdam's merchants financed expeditions to the four corners of the world and they acquired the overseas possessions which formed the seeds of the later Dutch colonies. The most influential of these merchant groups was the Dutch East India Company, founded 1602, which became the first multi-national corporation to issue stocks to finance its business.  By allowing for sailors to invest in the cargo that they transported, it created an incentive for individual laborers to be vested in the goods they carried and tightened their allegiances to corporate outcomes, whereas before sailors were a migratory agents. Rembrandt painted in this century, and the city expanded greatly around its canals during this time. Amsterdam was the most important point for the transshipment of goods in Europe and it was the leading financial center of the world.

Government by regents

By the mid-1660s Amsterdam had reached the optimum population (about 200,000) for the level of trade, commerce and agriculture then available to support it. The city contributed the largest quota in taxes to the States of Holland which in turn contributed over half the quota to the States General. Amsterdam was also one of the most reliable in settling tax demands and therefore was able to use the threat to withhold such payments to good effect.

Amsterdam was governed by a body of regents, a large, but closed, oligarchy with control over all aspects of the city's life, and a dominant voice in the foreign affairs of Holland. Only men with sufficient wealth and a long enough residence within the city could join the ruling class. The first step for an ambitious and wealthy merchant family was to arrange a marriage with a long-established regent family. In the 1670s, one such union, that of the Trip family (the Amsterdam branch of the Swedish arms makers) with the son of Burgomaster Valckenier, extended the influence and patronage available to the latter and strengthened his dominance of the council. The oligarchy in Amsterdam thus gained strength from its breadth and openness. In the smaller towns, family interest could unite members on policy decisions but contraction through intermarriage could lead to the degeneration of the quality of the members. In Amsterdam, the network was so large that members of the same family could be related to opposing factions and pursue widely separated interests.  The young men who had risen to positions of authority in the 1670s and 1680s consolidated their hold on office well into the 1690s and even the new century.

Amsterdam's regents provided good services to residents. They spent heavily on the water-ways and other essential infrastructure, as well as municipal almshouses for the elderly, hospitals and churches.  The regents favoring of private investment also helped to raise standards of living, as construction of commercially viable and advanced windmills brought more efficient factories for refining goods and irrigation pumps to the region, allowing for one of the earliest industrial driven economies.

Amsterdam's wealth was generated by its commerce, which was in turn sustained by the judicious encouragement of entrepreneurs whatever their origin.  This arrangement was supported by low interest-rates to private businesses, whereas communities governed by monarchies at the time sought to siphon profits.   This open-door policy has been interpreted as proof of a tolerant ruling class. But toleration was practiced for the convenience of the city. Therefore, the wealthy Sephardic Jews from Portugal were welcomed and accorded all privileges except those of citizenship, but the poor Ashkenazi Jews from Eastern Europe were far more carefully vetted and those who became dependent on the city were encouraged to move on. Similarly, provision for the housing of Huguenot immigrants was made in 1681 when Louis XIV's religious policy was beginning to drive these Protestants out of France; no encouragement was given to the dispossessed Dutch from the countryside or other towns of Holland. The regents encouraged immigrants to build churches and provided sites or buildings for churches and temples for all but the most radical sects and the native Catholics by the 1670s (although even the Catholics could practice quietly in a chapel within the Begijnhof).

Immigration
During the 17th and 18th century, Amsterdam was a city where immigrants formed the majority. Most immigrants were either Lutheran Protestant Germans, French Huguenots, or Portuguese/Spanish Jews. There was also an influx of Flemish refugees following the fall of Antwerp.

The enormous impact of German immigration can be seen nowadays in the surnames, which are often German. The integration of immigrants was smooth. It was not hard to find work as a craftsman, but craftsmen were forced to join guilds, to serve in the city patrol and to cooperate in the local district to compete with other districts. These were powerful institutions that resulted in quick integration, especially since all these institutions were mainly filled with immigrants or children of immigrants. The city council of Amsterdam consisted of people with all kinds of backgrounds: Dutch, German, Flemish, French, Scottish.

Another group of people who immigrated to Amsterdam from the 16th century to the 19th century was the Armenians. The Armenians were famous traders; their trading network stretched from the far east (Manila, India, Nepal, Iran) All the way to Europe and, most notably, Amsterdam. The Armenians mainly traded Iranian silk, which they had a monopoly over. Iranian silk was very popular in Amsterdam; hence, it made the Armenian community very wealthy, and the Armenians flourished in Amsterdam. Amsterdam was known for religious and ethnic tolerance, where they welcomed people from all over the world. Hence, it made Amsterdam a hotspot for Armenians.
Although Armenian traces in the Netherlands go back to the 4th century, Armenian merchants started appearing on mass in the 12th century, and the highest numbers were in the 17th century. The Armenian traders imported and exported almost everything, selling spices, gold, pearls, diamonds, and silk to the Dutch and buying yellow amber from them, which they sold in Smyrna.
Due to religious and ethnic tolerance, the Armenians built their own churches, cultural centers, schools, universities, and printing presses in Amsterdam and the rest of the Netherlands. These churches and cultural centers exist to this day.
In response to Dutch generosity, the Armenians integrated into their society very smoothly, and they became part of its society. The Armenians even played a significant role within the Dutch Resistance during WW2. However, nearly all of the Armenian soldiers were executed by the Germans. The Dutch government has commemorated these brave Armenians by erecting a memorial in Zeeland (Middelharnis).

A Dutch writer has said in De Amsterdammer, a magazine of the date of August 14, 1887, that:
“The story of the Armenian community is a golden page in the history of the city of Amsterdam.”

Plague
However, the city's trading status meant it suffered from an outbreak of bubonic plague from 1663 to 1666, supposed to have come from Algiers to Amsterdam.  (The plague also broke out in the trading center of London in June 1665.)  Though it had little initial effect, the impact grew in autumn 1663 and in 1664. The wife and youngest daughter of well known collector of paintings Jan J. Hinlopen, as well as Rembrandt's partner Hendrickje Stoffels, fell victim to it that autumn.  According to Samuel Pepys, for a few weeks at the end of 1663, ships from Hamburg and Amsterdam were quarantined for thirty days. In 1664, 24,148 people were buried in Amsterdam. More than 10% of the population died in this period - everybody that came into contact with the plague was at risk. At the time people assumed the plague was caused by the digging of new canals.

Surprisingly, tobacco smoke was regarded as an effective prophylactic against the plague.  With the prospect of the plague, as well as war with England looming, the English ambassador commented in May 1664: "there are dead this last week to the number 338 at Amsterdam and if the plague thus increases within, and a warre with His Majestie without, there will be little need of that vast new towne which they are making there".  Rich people left the cities to avoid the disease, but in the worst week of the pandemic of 1664, in Amsterdam there were 1,041 burials compared with 7,000 in the late summer of 1665 in London, a city twice its size.  The mayors warned the population that eating salad, spinach or prunes could be unhealthy.  The vroedschap shut the theatre, allowing performances to resume only in 1666, though Jan J. Hinlopen's own death in 1666 is ascribed to the plague.  Sailors on ships out to sea were relatively safe.

Decline and modernization

The 18th and early 19th centuries saw a decline in Amsterdam's prosperity. The wars of the Dutch Republic with the United Kingdom and France took their toll on Amsterdam. During the Napoleonic wars, Amsterdam's fortunes reached their lowest point; however, with the establishment of the Kingdom of the Netherlands in 1815, things slowly began to improve. In Amsterdam, new developments were started by people like Samuel Sarphati who found their inspiration in Paris.

At the end of the 19th century, the Industrial Revolution reached Amsterdam. The Amsterdam-Rijn kanaal was dug to give Amsterdam a direct connection to the Rhine and the Noordzee kanaal to give the port a connection with the North Sea. Both projects improved communication with the rest of Europe and the world dramatically. They gave the economy a big boost.

The industrial revolution led to a huge influx of worker migrants from the Dutch countryside into the city of Amsterdam. This occurred during the rise of socialism in Amsterdam. The Dutch authorities tried to destroy socialism by treating socialists with violence. During the 1880s and 1890s, fights between the police and the socialists occurred on a weekly basis. A notorious event was the Palingoproer (eel riots) in 1886, when 26 demonstrators were killed by the army after the police were unable to control a riotous crowd of men watching an outlawed game of eel-pulling. Another was the Orange riots of 1887, which included the destruction of a socialist pub by orangists and the arrest of the defending socialists, while the organists were not punished at all. The most popular socialist leaders of the 1890s were those who had been in jail most of the time. One socialist was so angry with the police, that he tried to kill the chief superintendent of the police. He shot a hole in the hat of the superintendent and was sentenced to many years in jail after being beaten up by policemen. After his release, he was welcomed as a hero during a parade with a laurel wreath on his head, while people were crying in the crowded streets filled with workers from Amsterdam.

The end of the 19th century is sometimes called Amsterdam's second Golden Age. New museums, the Centraal Station and the Concertgebouw were built. Also built was the Stelling van Amsterdam, a unique ring of 42 forts and land that could be inundated to defend the city against an attack. Amsterdam's population grew significantly during this period.

20th century
During World War I, the Netherlands remained neutral, but Amsterdam suffered the effects of the war when food became scarce.  When working-class women started to plunder a ship with army supplies, the military was brought in.  Workers joined their wives in the plundering and the soldiers opened fire on them.  Six people were killed and almost 100 were wounded.

During the interwar period, the city continued to expand, most notably to the west of the Jordaan district in the Frederik Hendrikbuurt and surrounding neighbourhoods.

In 1932, a dike separating the Zuider Zee from the North Sea, the Afsluitdijk, was completed.  The Zuider Zee was no more.  The new lake behind the dyke was called IJsselmeer.  For the first time in its history, Amsterdam had no open communication with the sea.

During World War II, German troops occupied the city.  More than 100,000 Jews were deported, famously including Anne Frank and her sister Margot Frank, almost completely wiping out the Jewish community. Before the war, Amsterdam was the world's center for the diamond trade. Since this trade was mostly in the hands of Jewish businessmen and craftsmen, the diamond trade essentially disappeared.

Amsterdam made a bid for the 1952 Olympic Games (summer games) but was unsuccessful.  The games went to Helsinki.

During the 1970s, the number of foreign immigrants, primarily from Suriname, Turkey, and Morocco, grew strongly.  This increase led to an exodus of people to the 'growth cities' of Purmerend, Almere and other cities near Amsterdam.  However, neighbourhoods like the Pijp and the Jordaan, which had previously been working class, became sought out places of residence for the newly wealthy yuppies and students. Amsterdam that used to be a poor city in the Netherlands turned into an economically rich city thanks to the new economical trend towards a service-economy instead of an industrial economy.

In 1992, an El Al cargo plane crashed in the Bijlmermeer in Amsterdam Zuidoost. This disaster, called the Bijlmerramp, caused the death of at least 43 people.

At the beginning of the millennium, social problems such as safety, ethnic discrimination, and segregation between religious and social groups began to develop. 45% of the population of Amsterdam has non-Dutch parents. Large social groups are people from Surinam, the Dutch Antilles, Morocco and Turkey. Amsterdam is characterized by its (perceived) social tolerance and diversity. The social tolerance was endangered by the murder of Dutch film-maker Theo van Gogh on 2 November 2004 by a Mohamed Bouyeri, an Islamic fundamentalist. The mayor of Amsterdam, Job Cohen, and his alderman for integration Ahmed Aboutaleb formulated a policy of "keeping things together" which involves social dialogue, tolerance and harsh measures against those who break the law.

Social struggles 

The cultural revolution of the 1960s and 1970s made Amsterdam the magisch centrum (magical center) of Europe. The use of soft drugs was tolerated and this policy made the city a popular destination for hippies. The period 1966–1986, however, was described by Geert Mak as the "twenty years' urban war" (twintigjarige stadsoorlog): an extended period of social struggle between the city's radical youth and its government. The war started with the appearance of the local anarchist movement, Provo, so called because it liked to provoke authorities and bourgeois society with (non-violent) happenings and Dada-inspired absurdism. The Amsterdam police struck back at Provo with force; Mak explains the extreme police violence by reference to events in the direct aftermath of World War II, when the resistance proved unable to replace the Nazi-friendly head of police with their own candidate, thus leaving police power in authoritarian hands.

After the disbanding of Provo, new movements arose, including the green Kabouters and the squatters' movement. The latter raised the question of "who owns the city" and took direct action to show their stance on this issue, opposing speculators' claims to land in the face of housing deficits. Tensions escalated to the point where the army was called in to clear streets of barricades and in 1980, street fights took place in the center between police and large numbers of squatters and their sympathizers, at the very moment that Queen Beatrix's coronation was taking place inside the New Church on Dam square - see Amsterdam coronation riots for more. The loss of public sympathy stemming from this event eventually led to the downfall of the squatter movement, and by the mid-1980s it was effectively marginalized.

21st century 
In the early years of the twenty-first century, the Amsterdam city center successfully attracted large numbers of tourists by means of campaigns such as I Amsterdam. Between 2012 and 2015, 3000 hotel rooms were built, Airbnb added another 11.000 accommodations and the annual number of visitors rose from 10 million to 17 million. Real estate prices have surged, making the center unaffordable for the city's inhabitants, while local shops are making way for tourist-oriented ones. These developments have evoked comparisons with Venice, a city already overwhelmed by the tourist influx.

Construction of a metro line connecting the part of the city north of the IJ to the center was started in 2003. The project is controversial because its cost exceeded its budget by a factor three by 2008, because of fears for damage to buildings in the center, and because construction had to be halted and restarted multiple times. The metro 52 line (called the Noord/Zuidlijn, or North/South Line in English) was officially opened on 21 July 2018 by the mayor of Amsterdam, Femke Halsema.  

Since 2014, renewed focus has been given to urban regeneration and renewal, especially to areas directly bordering the city center such as Frederik Hendrikbuurt. This urban renewal and expansion of the traditional center of the city is part of the Structural Vision Amsterdam 2040 initiative.

Cultural life 
In the 15th and 16th century, cultural life in Amsterdam consisted mainly of festivals. During the later part of the 16th century, Amsterdams Rederijkerskamer (Chamber of Rhetoric) organized contests between different Chambers in the reading of poetry and drama. In 1638, Amsterdam got its first theatre. Ballet performances were given in this theatre as early as 1642. In the 18th century, French theater became popular. Opera could be seen in Amsterdam from 1677, first only Italian and French operas, but in the 18th century German operas. In the 19th century, popular culture was centered on the Nes area in Amsterdam (mainly vaudeville and music hall). The metronome, one of the most important advances in European classical music, was invented here in 1812 by Dietrich Nikolaus Winkel. At the end of this century, the Rijksmuseum and Gemeentelijk Museum were built. In 1888, the Concertgebouworkest was established. With the 20th century came cinema, radio, and television. Though the studios are in Hilversum and Aalsmeer, Amsterdam's influence on programming is very strong. After World War II popular culture became the dominant cultural phenomenon in Amsterdam.

History of the municipality 
When the municipality was created during the French occupation, it covered the city (then consisting of only the central part inside the canals) and the immediate surroundings, less than 10% of the current municipality. When the city grew, it annexed several neighbouring municipalities:
 Sloten (covering the villages of Sloten, Sloterdijk, and Osdorp, in the west), annexed in 1921
 Buiksloot, annexed in 1921, now part of Amsterdam-Noord
 Nieuwendam (covering Nieuwendam and Zunderdorp), annexed in 1921, now part of Amsterdam-Noord
 Ransdorp (covering Ransdorp, Schellingwoude, Durgerdam, and Holysloot), annexed in 1921, now part of Amsterdam-Noord
 Watergraafsmeer, annexed in 1921
 a part of Nieuweramstel (covering the village of Buitenveldert)
 a part of Weesperkarspel (covering the Bijlmermeer and the village of Driemond), annexed in 1966, now Amsterdam-Zuidoost
 Weesp, annexed as a special city area in 2022, bordering Amsterdam-Zuidoost.

In 1995, the national government proposed the creation of a 'city province', consisting of Amsterdam and neighbouring towns.  This proposal was rejected by the people in a referendum.  The opposition was not so much against creating the city province as it was against the splitting of the city into parts.  Opposers feared this would destroy the city's cohesion.  After the referendum, the city province proposal was shelved.  Nevertheless, since 1995, city parts have gradually become more autonomous, and neighbouring towns have been drawn into the city, politically and economically.  In a sense, the city province has arrived in the form of 'Greater Amsterdam'.

See also
 Timeline of Amsterdam
 Philip Slier

References

Further reading

Cotterell, Geoffrey. Amsterdam: The Life of a City (1972)
de Waard, M., ed. Imagining Global Amsterdam: History, Culture, and Geography in a World City. Amsterdam: Amsterdam University Press 2013.
Feddes, Fred. A Millenium of Amsterdam: Spatial History of a Marvelous City. Bussum: Thoth 2012. 
Israel, Jonathan I. The Dutch Republic, Its Rise, Greatness, and Fall 1477-1806 (1995)  excerpt and text search
 Jonker, Joost. Merchants, Bankers, Middlemen: The Amsterdam Money Market during the First Half of the Nineteenth Century. Amsterdam: Amsterdam University Press 1996  
 Lindemann, Mary. The Merchant Republics: Amsterdam, Antwerp, and Hamburg, 1648-1790 (Cambridge University Press, 2014) 356 pp. 
 Regin, Derek. Traders, artists, burghers: A cultural history of Amsterdam in the 17th century (1976)
 Roekholt, Richter. A short history of Amsterdam (2004)
 Schama, Simon. The Embarrassment of Riches: An Interpretation of Dutch Culture in the Golden Age (1997)
Shorto, Russell. Amsterdam: A History of the World's Most Liberal City. New York: Vintage Books 2014.

External links
Website of the Amsterdam City Archives
Amsterdam info
Amsterdam Below the Surface, interactive website about archeological findings (2018)